Olivia Bucio (born October 26, 1954 in Uruapan, Michoacán, Mexico), is a Mexican actress. She worked with Televisa as an actress of telenovelas.

Filmography

Television

Television programs

References

External links 

1954 births
Mexican telenovela actresses
20th-century Mexican actresses
21st-century Mexican actresses
Actresses from Michoacán
People from Uruapan
Living people